China National Highway 228 is a planned highway of the National Highway System of the People's Republic of China to run from Dandong, Liaoning on the China–North Korea border to Dongxing, Guangxi on the China–Vietnam border.

Route 
The route will run from Dandong, Liaoning on the China–North Korea border to Dongxing, Guangxi on the China–Vietnam border. En route, it will pass through Dalian and Yingkou in Liaoning; Binhai New Area in Tianjin; Huanghua in Hebei; Dongying, Yantai, Weihai, Qinghai, and Rizhao in Shandong; Lianyungang and Nantong in Jiangsu; Shanghai; Jiaxing, Ningbo, Taizhou, Wenzhou, and Ningde in Zhejiang; Fuzhou, Quanzhou, and Xiamen in Fujian; Shantou, Shenzhen, Zhuhai, Zhanjiang in Guangdong; and Beihai and Fangchenggang in Guangxi.

Shanghai segment
The segment of G228 in Shanghai is planned to follow the basic route of the G40 Shanghai–Xi'an Expressway, and will pass through Chongming District, Pudong District, Fengxian District, and Jinshan District.

Zhejiang segment
G228 will be the first national highway serving Yuhuan County.

See also
 China National Highway 219, which follows the southern and western land borders of China.
 China National Highway 331, which follows the northern border of China

References

228